KERN (1180 AM) is a commercial radio station licensed to Wasco-Greenacres, California, and serving the Bakersfield metropolitan area. The station is owned by American General Media.  The radio studios and offices are in the American General Media complex at 1400 Easton Drive, STE 134 in Bakersfield.

KERN airs a talk radio format.  On weekdays, local host Scott Cox anchors "First Look" and Ralph Bailey is heard in afternoon drive time.  The rest of the weekday schedule comes from nationally syndicated conservative talk shows:  Dan Bongino, Charlie Kirk, Ben Shapiro, The Clay Travis and Buck Sexton Show and Red Eye Radio.  Weekends feature shows on health, money, real estate, home repair, law and computers. Weekend syndicated shows include Kim Komando, Bill Cunningham and Bruce DuMont. Some weekend hours are paid brokered programming. Most hours begin with world and national news from ABC News Radio.  KERN is the flagship station of the Bakersfield College Renegades sports teams and Cal State Bakersfield Men's Basketball.

Transmitter and FM translator
KERN operates with 50,000 watts by day, the maximum power permitted for commercial AM stations. Because AM 1180 is a clear-channel frequency, reserved for Class A WHAM in Rochester, New York, KERN must reduce power at night to 10,000 watts, and uses a directional antenna at all times to limit interference.  The transmitter is located off Jackson Avenue in Wasco.

Programming is simulcast on an FM translator at 96.1 MHz.  The station calls itself "Kern Radio News Talk 1180 and 96.1."

History
KERN signed on the air on January 3, 1932.  It broadcast at 1370 kilocycles, powered at 100 watts.  In its early days it was owned by the Bee Bakersfield Broadcasting Company, a subsidiary of The McClatchy Company, owner of a number of radio stations and newspapers in California. KERN served as the CBS Radio network affiliate for Bakersfield, broadcasting its schedule of dramas, comedies, news, sports, soap operas, game shows and big band broadcasts during the "Golden Age of Radio."

KERN moved to 1410 kHz in 1941 as the result of NARBA (North American Regional Broadcasting Agreement), increasing power to 1,000 watts. In 1948, it added an FM station at 94.1, KERN-FM (now KISV). At first, KERN-FM simulcast most of the programming of the AM station. As network programming moved to TV in the 1950s, KERN switched to music programming with local air personalities and news. In the 1960s, KERN flipped to a Top 40 sound. Johnny Mitchell, Program Director and Phil Drake, Music Director took this fledgling station to a solid number one in 1973, soundly beating its competitor, KAFY 550 AM (now KUZZ). KERN was among the first stations to carry the nationally syndicated countdown show American Top 40 hosted by Casey Kasem, beginning on July 4, 1970.  Also in 1970, KERN sold its FM station to The Reliable Broadcast Company, which had just bought 1350 KLYD (now KLHC). Emmy Award winning writer Ken Levine (then known as Ken Stevens) got his start in radio at KERN in 1971.

As Top 40 listening switched to FM in the late 1970s, KERN moved to a middle of the road format, with national news supplied by ABC Radio News.  In the 1980s, KERN began adding some talk shows to its schedule. By the mid-1990s, KERN had made the switch to all talk, using programming from the ABC Talk Radio Network and NBC's Talknet.

On December 29, 2008, KERN started simulcasting on 1180 AM to get listeners used to the new frequency as part of a frequency swap with sister station KERI, which ran a religious format. (For the history of the 1180 station before 2008, see "KERI.")  The KERN call sign was officially moved from 1410 to 1180 on December 30, 2008 and the KERI call sign was moved to 1410. On January 1, 2009, the Christian music format was reunited with the KERI call sign on 1410 AM.

Previous logo

References

External links
FCC History Cards for KERN

Corporate site

News and talk radio stations in the United States
ERN
Radio stations established in 1984
1984 establishments in California